The 2013 Players Championship was a golf tournament in Florida on the PGA Tour, held  at TPC Sawgrass in Ponte Vedra Beach, southeast of Jacksonville. It was the 40th Players Championship.

Tiger Woods won his second Players Championship, two strokes ahead of runners-up David Lingmerth, Jeff Maggert, and Kevin Streelman. Woods previously won twelve years earlier in 2001, after winning the previous three majors and the next for his Tiger Slam.

Defending champion Matt Kuchar finished thirteen strokes back at even par, tied for 48th place.

Venue

Course layout

Field
The field consisted of 144 players meeting criteria 1–12, plus the winner of the 2012 Senior Players Championship.

1. Winners of PGA Tour events since last Players
Charlie Beljan (3), Jonas Blixt (3), Keegan Bradley (2,3,5,7,9), Scott Brown, Jason Dufner (2,3,9), Ernie Els (2,3,5,9), Derek Ernst, Tommy Gainey (3), Sergio García (2,3,6,9), Brian Gay (3), Russell Henley, J. J. Henry (3), Billy Horschel (9,11), Dustin Johnson (2,3,9,11), Zach Johnson (2,3,9), Matt Kuchar (2,3,6,7,9,11), Martin Laird (3), Marc Leishman (3), Graeme McDowell (3,5,9,11), Rory McIlroy (2,3,5,9), John Merrick (3), Phil Mickelson (2,3,5,9,11), Ryan Moore (2,3,9), Scott Piercy (2,3,9), D. A. Points (3,9,11), Ted Potter Jr. (3), Adam Scott (2,3,5,7,9,11), Webb Simpson (2,3,5,9), Brandt Snedeker (2,3,8,9,11), Scott Stallings (3), Kevin Streelman (3,11), Michael Thompson (3,9), Nick Watney (2,3,7,9), Tiger Woods (2,3,5,7,9,11)

2. Top 30 from previous season's FedEx Cup points list
Luke Donald (3,7,9), Rickie Fowler (3,9), Jim Furyk (3,8,9), Robert Garrigus (3,9), John Huh (3), Hunter Mahan (3,7,9), Louis Oosthuizen (3,5,9), Carl Pettersson (3,9), Justin Rose (3,7,9), John Senden (3), Steve Stricker (3,9), Bo Van Pelt (3,9), Bubba Watson (3,5,9), Lee Westwood (3,9)

3. Top 125 from previous season's PGA Tour money list
Robert Allenby, Aaron Baddeley, Bae Sang-moon, Ricky Barnes, Jason Bohn, Jonathan Byrd, Chad Campbell, Roberto Castro, Bud Cauley, Greg Chalmers, Kevin Chappell, K. J. Choi (6), Tim Clark (6,9), Will Claxton, Ben Crane, Ben Curtis, Brian Davis, Jason Day (9), Brendon de Jonge, Graham DeLaet, James Driscoll, Ken Duke, Harris English, Matt Every, Martin Flores, Tom Gillis, Bill Haas (8,9), Brian Harman, Pádraig Harrington (5), David Hearn, Tim Herron, Charley Hoffman, Charles Howell III, Freddie Jacobson (9), Chris Kirk, Colt Knost, Jason Kokrak, Davis Love III, Jeff Maggert, David Mathis, Troy Matteson, William McGirt, George McNeill, Bryce Molder, Noh Seung-yul, Geoff Ogilvy, Sean O'Hair, Jeff Overton, Greg Owen, Ryan Palmer, Pat Perez, Ian Poulter (7,9), Dicky Pride, John Rollins, Andrés Romero, Rory Sabbatini, Charl Schwartzel (5,9), Vijay Singh, Kevin Stadler, Kyle Stanley, Brendan Steele, Henrik Stenson (6,9), Chris Stroud, Daniel Summerhays, Josh Teater, David Toms, Cameron Tringale, Johnson Wagner, Jimmy Walker, Boo Weekley, Charlie Wi, Mark Wilson
Blake Adams, Bob Estes, Harrison Frazar, J. B. Holmes, Troy Kelly, Spencer Levin, John Mallinger, Kevin Na, and Jhonattan Vegas did not play.

4. Top 125 from current season - Medical Extension
Retief Goosen

5. Major champions from the past five years
Ángel Cabrera, Stewart Cink, Lucas Glover, Martin Kaymer (9), Yang Yong-eun
Darren Clarke did not play.

6. Players Championship winners from the past five years

7. WGC winners from the past three years (WGC-HSBC Champions winners only if PGA Tour members)

8. The Tour Championship winners from the past three years

9. Top 50 from the Official World Golf Ranking as of April 28
Gonzalo Fernández-Castaño, Branden Grace, Peter Hanson, Francesco Molinari, Thorbjørn Olesen
George Coetzee, Nicolas Colsaerts, Jamie Donaldson, Paul Lawrie, and Richard Sterne did not play.

10. Web.com Tour money leader from prior season
Casey Wittenberg

11. Top 10 current year FedEx Cup points leaders as of April 28

12. Field filled to 144 through current year FedEx Cup standings as of April 28
Erik Compton, Luke Guthrie, James Hahn, Matt Jones, Jerry Kelly, Scott Langley, Richard H. Lee, Justin Leonard, David Lingmerth, David Lynn, Brian Stuard, Nicholas Thompson

13. Senior Players champion from prior year (did not count against field of 144)
Joe Daley

Nationalities in the field

Round summaries

First round
Thursday, May 9, 2013

Playing in his first Players Championship, Roberto Castro tied the course record at 63 (−9) in relatively benign morning conditions. His round, which consisted of seven birdies, one eagle, and no bogeys, tied the record set by Fred Couples (third round) in 1992 and matched by Greg Norman (first round) in 1994. Zach Johnson and Rory McIlroy were three shots back, with six other players, including Tiger Woods, four shots back.

Second round
Friday, May 10, 2013

Unheralded first-round leader Castro fell far back into the pack after a second round 78. The halfway leader was 2008 winner Sergio García after some impressive putting saw him to a 65 and 133 (−11). A stroke back was 2001 winner and world number one Woods, who shot a second straight 67 for a 134, his best 36-hole score at TPC Sawgrass by six strokes. Notables to miss the cut included former winners Phil Mickelson and Tim Clark, and world number four Justin Rose.

Third round
Saturday, May 11, 2013

A rain delay on Saturday afternoon left eight players unable to complete their third rounds, with play to be completed Sunday morning. With one hole to play, unheralded rookie David Lingmerth, who had missed five straight cuts since a playoff loss in the early season, led by two from three former winners. 49-year-old Jeff Maggert had earlier shot the round of the day with a 66.

Sunday, May 12, 2013

A late bogey for Lingmerth, and strong play from the final group, left a three-way tie for the lead on a congested leaderboard at the conclusion of the third round. Lingmerth would play the final round with García, who finished birdie-birdie-par, while co-leader Tiger Woods was one group back, alongside another outsider in former U.S. Amateur runner-up Casey Wittenberg. Ryan Palmer, who had lost a close friend in a traffic accident at the start of the week, was also amongst those one stroke back.

Final round
Sunday, May 12, 2013

García and Lingmerth were in the last group, with Woods in the group just ahead. Leading by several shots, Woods double-bogeyed No. 14 with a pulled hook into the water, which brought the field back in play. Woods came back into the lead by making a birdie on No. 16, after a bunker shot ended just a couple feet from the hole. García hit his ball to the center of the No. 16 green and made a two-putt for a birdie, tying Woods for the lead going into No. 17. Lingmerth hit his second shot into the left green side bunker at No. 16, and hit a sand shot to just a few feet; he then converted on his birdie attempt to get one behind the leaders heading into No. 17.

Lingmerth hit his tee shot to seven feet but did not make the birdie putt, leaving him with a par. García, with a pitching wedge, hit the first tee shot in the water, a few feet short of the island green. On his next attempt, his ball hit the island green surface but bounded back into the water. His third shot hit the center of the green; he ended up with a quadruple-bogey seven that took him out of contention. He took a double-bogey on the final hole to finish six strokes back.

Woods' tee shot at the 18th was a slight draw, to the center of the fairway and the approach shot was within ; he two-putted for par and a 70. Lingmerth could have tied Woods with a birdie, but his tee shot with a driver went too long and into the right rough. His approach shot ended up  from the pin and his birdie attempt missed the hole by several inches, ending off the green and he bogeyed. Woods won by two shots, his second win at the event, in his 300th career PGA Tour start.

Scorecard
Final round

Cumulative tournament scores, relative to par
{|class="wikitable" span = 50 style="font-size:85%;
|- 
|  style="background:Pink; width:10px;"|
|Birdie
|  style="background:PaleGreen; width:10px;"|
|Bogey
|  style="background:Green; width:10px;"|
|Double bogey
|  style="background:Olive; width:10px;"|
|Triple bogey+
|}
Source:

Spectators 
The attendance of 173,946 set a single-week record and the single-day record was broken with 45,281 on Saturday. TV ratings were up 68 percent from 2012; the final-round ratings were the highest for the tournament since 2001.

References

External links
The Players Championship website

2013
2013 in golf
2013 in American sports
2013 in sports in Florida
May 2013 sports events in the United States